Sándor Mátyás (Serbian: Шaндop Maћaш, Šandor Maćaš; born 21 March 1973) is a retired Hungarian professional football midfielder.

Born in Senta, SR Serbia, Yugoslavia, during his career he played for FK Spartak Subotica, first in the Yugoslav First League, and since 1992 in the First League of FR Yugoslavia. In 1995, he moved to Hungary where he signed with Békéscsaba 1912 Előre SE.

References

Living people
1973 births
People from Senta
Serbian emigrants to Hungary
Hungarians in Vojvodina
Hungarian footballers
Serbian footballers
Hungarian expatriate footballers
FK Spartak Subotica players
Békéscsaba 1912 Előre footballers
Association football midfielders
Yugoslav First League players
First League of Serbia and Montenegro players
Nemzeti Bajnokság I players

hu:Sándor Mátyás